St. Armands Key is an island in Sarasota Bay off the west coast of Florida in the United States. It is part of the city of Sarasota, Florida. The island is connected to the mainland by the John Ringling Causeway.

History 
A Frenchman named Charles St. Amand bought property on the island in 1893. His name was misspelled in land deeds, and this misspelled name is still used today.

Circus magnate John Ringling purchased the St. Armands Key property in 1917 and planned a development which included residential lots and a shopping center laid out in a circle. As no bridge to the key had yet been built, Ringling engaged an old paddle-wheel steamboat, the "Success," to service as a work boat. John Ringling financed the construction of a bridge connecting the key to the mainland and became the first person to drive across it in 1926.

St. Armands Circle 
St. Armands Key features a large traffic circle with a small park in the center. The traffic circle is known as St. Armands Circle or "The Circle." The area is largely commercial, containing more than 130 stores and restaurants. The circle contains many restaurants, tobacco shops, clothing stores, and other retail outlets.

The Circle also features a statue walk that features works originally purchased by John Ringling. Ringling's love of fine art inspired The Save Our Statues project which was undertaken during 2007 and completed in early 2008. Additional beautification efforts including on-going maintenance of the statues and landscaping generally consistent with John Ringling’s 1920s landscape plans.

St. Armands Circle is also home to the Circus Ring of Fame. Over 150 large bronze plaques encircle the park with the names and histories of performing artists and influential executives recognized for achievement in circus arts and culture.

St. Armands Circle branches off into different directions with the shops on the outside of the circle:
To the north, State Road 789, which goes to Longboat Key
John Ringling Boulevard to the east, which goes to the city of Sarasota and intersects U.S. 41 which heads north to Sarasota-Bradenton International Airport
Lido Key and Lido Beach, to the south

References

Islands of Florida
Islands of Sarasota County, Florida
Sarasota, Florida